Cyperus corymbosus is a species of sedge that is endemic to parts of South America, Africa, the Middle East and western Asia.

The species was first formally described by the botanist Christen Friis Rottbøll in 1772.

See also 
 List of Cyperus species

References 

corymbosus
Taxa named by Christen Friis Rottbøll
Plants described in 1772
Flora of Angola
Flora of Algeria
Flora of Assam (region)
Flora of Brazil
Flora of Botswana
Flora of Bangladesh
Flora of Chad
Flora of Cuba
Flora of Guyana
Flora of India
Flora of Iraq
Flora of Ivory Coast
Flora of South Africa
Flora of Madagascar
Flora of Mozambique
Flora of Myanmar
Flora of Nepal
Flora of Pakistan
Flora of Sri Lanka
Flora of Suriname
Flora of Tanzania
Flora of Togo
Flora of Thailand
Flora of Venezuela
Flora of Vietnam
Flora without expected TNC conservation status